In dynamical systems theory, the Gingerbreadman map is a chaotic two-dimensional map. It is given by the piecewise linear transformation:

See also 
 List of chaotic maps

References

External links

Chaotic maps
Exactly solvable models